Ben Young is a Grand Prix motorcycle racer and superbike racer from Scotland now lives in Collingwood, Ontario, Canada. He won the 2019 Canadian Superbike Championship aboard his BMW S1000RR.

Career statistics

By class

Canadian Superbike Championship

MotoAmerica

British Superbike Championship

Moto GP

References

External links
 Rider website
 Profile on csbk.com
 Profile on motogp.com
 Profile on fogi.us

Scottish motorcycle racers
People from Bathgate
Motorsport in Canada
Motorcycle racing in Canada
1993 births
Living people